Ron Burak (born 30 June 1953) is a Canadian rower. He competed in the men's eight event at the 1976 Summer Olympics.

References

1953 births
Living people
Canadian male rowers
Olympic rowers of Canada
Rowers at the 1976 Summer Olympics
Sportspeople from Kirkland Lake
Pan American Games medalists in rowing
Pan American Games gold medalists for Canada
Pan American Games bronze medalists for Canada
Rowers at the 1975 Pan American Games
Rowers at the 1983 Pan American Games
Medalists at the 1983 Pan American Games
20th-century Canadian people
21st-century Canadian people